Marina is a city in Monterey County, California, United States. As of the 2020 census, the population was 22,359, up from 19,718 in 2010.

Marina was incorporated in 1975 and is the newest city in the Monterey area. It includes part of the California State University, Monterey Bay campus, the UC Santa Cruz UC MBEST center, and the Veterans Transition Center (VTC). In 2012, Marina was named one of the 100 Best Communities for Young People by America's Promise Alliance. The Fort Ord Station Veterinary Hospital, built in 1941 to provide healthcare for U.S. Army horses and mules, was listed on the National Register of Historic Places in 2014.

History
The Marina post office opened in 1916. Marina incorporated in 1975. The city's history is intertwined with that of Fort Ord. Fort Ord lands were used as an infantry training center since the Mexican–American War. Major growth took place in 1938 with the first joint Army and Navy maneuvers held in 1940.

Fort Ord was selected in 1991 for decommissioning, and the post formally closed after troop reassignment in 1994. In July 1994, the California State University, Monterey Bay, began its first academic year, and barracks were soon transformed into dorms.

As a result of base closure, some of the last undeveloped natural wildlands on the Monterey Peninsula are now overseen by the Bureau of Land Management, including  of trails for the public to explore on foot, bike or horseback. In 2012, President Barack Obama designated  of the closed base as a national monument managed by the BLM.

Cemex had a sand mining operation in the city along the Monterey Bay coastline that concerned environmentalists and scientists. The California Coastal Commission in March 2016 issued a Cease and Desist order asking for "administration civil penalties", stating that "the operation is narrowing beaches and impacting environmentally sensitive habitat." Cemex denied the allegations and continued to operate. A settlement was reached in 2017, and CEMEX ended mining in December 2020.

Geography
Unlike most other coastal cities in California, Marina's coastline remains undeveloped and protects rare species of butterflies, buckwheat, and sea lettuce. The city plans to adapt to climate change and sea level rise, based on managed retreat, and has been described as an example for other coastal cities.

Demographics

2010
At the 2010 census Marina had a population of 19,718. The racial makeup of Marina was 8,904 (45.1%) White, 1,487 (7.5%) African American, 140 (0.7%) Native American, 2,931 (9.9%) Asian, 544 (2.8%) Pacific Islander, 2,738 (13.9%) from other races, and 1,974 (10.0%) from two or more races. Hispanic or Latino of any race were 5,372 persons (27.2%).

The census reported that 18,827 people (95.5% of the population) lived in households, 891 (4.5%) lived in non-institutionalized group quarters, and no one was institutionalized.

There were 6,845 households, 2,517 (36.8%) had children under the age of 18 living in them, 3,126 (45.7%) were opposite-sex married couples living together, 1,128 (16.5%) had a female householder with no husband present, 417 (6.1%) had a male householder with no wife present. There were 517 (7.6%) unmarried opposite-sex partnerships. 1,587 households (23.2%) were one person and 553 (8.1%) had someone living alone who was 65 or older. The average household size was 2.75. There were 4,671 families (68.2% of households); the average family size was 3.26.

The age distribution was 4,773 people (24.2%) under the age of 18, 2,543 people (12.9%) aged 18 to 24, 5,188 people (26.3%) aged 25 to 44, 4,970 people (25.2%) aged 45 to 64, and 2,244 people (11.4%) who were 65 or older. The median age was 34.0 years. For every 100 females, there were 92.8 males. For every 100 females age 18 and over, there were 88.5 males.

There were 7,200 housing units at an average density of 737.5 per square mile, of the occupied units 2,963 (43.3%) were owner-occupied and 3,882 (56.7%) were rented. The homeowner vacancy rate was 2.4%; the rental vacancy rate was 3.6%. 7,857 people (39.8% of the population) lived in owner-occupied housing units and 10,970 people (55.6%) lived in rental housing units.

2000
As of the census of 2000, there were 25,101 people in 6,745 households, including 4,809 families, in the city. The racial makeup of the city was 43.7% White, 14.3% African American, 0.7% Native American, 16.3% Asian, 2.1% Pacific Islander, 14.8% from other races, and 8.0% from two or more races. Hispanic or Latino of any race were 23.2% of the population.

Of the 6,745 households 35.5% had children under the age of 18 living with them, 51.1% were married couples living together, 15.1% had a female householder with no husband present, and 28.7% were non-families. 21.4% of households were one person and 6.4% were one person aged 65 or older. The average household size was 2.79 and the average family size was 3.25.

The age distribution was 21.3% under the age of 18, 14.0% from 18 to 24, 38.4% from 25 to 44, 18.4% from 45 to 64, and 7.9% 65 or older. The median age was 32 years. For every 100 females, there were 133.8 males. For every 100 females age 18 and over, there were 142.3 males.

The median income for a household in the city was $43,000, and the median family income  was $46,139. Males had a median income of $43,139 versus $26,679 for females. The per capita income for the city was $18,860. 13.1% of the population and 10.7% of families were below the poverty line. Out of the total people living in poverty, 18.1% are under the age of 18 and 5.9% are 65 or older.

The military has been a significant part of life in Marina, which is located adjacent to the former Fort Ord, a US Army installation which closed in 1994 during the country's base closure initiative. Many former and retired military personnel reside in the city. The American Legion and the Veterans of Foreign Wars are active organizations. The Veterans Transition Center is instrumental in placing numerous US and state flags along Del Monte Blvd. and Reservation Road during the various holidays and special events, creating an "avenue of flags."

Parks and recreation
The Labor Day Parade & Family Festival held the Saturday before the official holiday pays homage to the significant military history of the town.

The annual Otter Fest in August welcomes back students, staff, and faculty to CSU, Monterey Bay. It began in 2010 with a Key to the City presentation to the campus president. It is named after the university's otter mascot.

Earth Day is celebrated in April as a community work party to maintain and improve Locke-Paddon Park. Citizens for Sustainable Marina is the lead planning group for the event.

Marina State Beach

Marina State Beach is a windswept beach area between State Route 1 and Monterey Bay where water recreation, hang gliding and paragliding are popular. There is a boardwalk through the Marina Dunes Natural Preserves.

Fort Ord Dunes State Park

Fort Ord Dunes State Park opened in March, 2009 and was formerly an Army practice firing range. Much of the park is located in the neighboring town of Seaside, California. Access for the park is located in Marina. Fort Ord Dunes State Park is a popular place for horseback riding, hiking, fishing and cycling. Fort Ord Dunes State Park abuts Marina State Beach.

Air Sports 
Marina is a popular destination for air sports enthusiasts. The tall sand dunes at Marina beaches provide optimal conditions for paragliding and hang gliding. A Marina based skydiving center has become a popular attraction because of its high altitude skydives and proximity to the beach.

Infrastructure
Marina Municipal Airport is a general aviation airport that is owned by the City of Marina. Skydive Monterey Bay conducts skydiving and parachuting activities on the south east side of the airport. In 2021, a manufacturing facility for Joby Aviation was approved at the airport.
Joby Aviation is a California-based venture-backed aerospace company, developing an electric vertical takeoff and landing (eVTOL) aircraft that it intends to operate as an air taxi service.

Notable people
 Retired Buffalo Bills linebacker Ty Powell is from Marina.
 Ron Rivera, NFL head coach of the Washington Commanders and former head coach of the Carolina Panthers, lived in Marina during his high school years.

See also
Coastal California
List of school districts in Monterey County, California
List of tourist attractions in Monterey County, California

References

External links

 

1975 establishments in California
Cities in Monterey County, California
Incorporated cities and towns in California
Populated coastal places in California
Populated places established in 1975